Sorok (Sorog) is a rural locality (an ulus) in Okinsky District, Republic of Buryatia, Russia. The population was 739 as of 2010. There are 24 streets.

Geography 
Sorok is located 41 km south of Orlik (the district's administrative centre) by road. Khurga is the nearest rural locality.

References 

Rural localities in Okinsky District